Jimmy Marton (born 26 August 1995) is a German footballer who plays as a centre-forward for FC Nöttingen.

Career
Marton made his professional debut for SpVgg Unterhaching in the 3. Liga on 25 October 2014, coming on as a substitute in the 70th minute for Lucas Hufnagel in the 0–1 home loss against VfB Stuttgart II.

References

External links
 Profile at DFB.de
 
 Profile at Fussball.de
 
 FC Nöttingen II statistics at Fussball.de
 Jimmy Marton at FuPa

1995 births
Living people
People from Bruchsal
Sportspeople from Karlsruhe (region)
Footballers from Baden-Württemberg
German footballers
Germany youth international footballers
Association football forwards
Karlsruher SC players
SpVgg Unterhaching players
SpVgg Unterhaching II players
TSV 1860 Munich II players
FC Nöttingen players
FC Astoria Walldorf players
3. Liga players
Regionalliga players
Oberliga (football) players